"Take Me Down" is a song by American rock band The Pretty Reckless from their third studio album, Who You Selling For (2016). It was released on July 15, 2016, as the album's lead single. The song topped the Billboard Mainstream Rock Songs chart in 2016, the band's fourth single to do so at the time, following "Heaven Knows", "Messed Up World (F'd Up World)", and "Follow Me Down".

Background
The song was released as the lead single for the band's third studio album Who You Selling For in July 2016. The single's artwork was also revealed, keeping with the band's past allusion to religion and the devil, this time being consisting of a human hand shaking hands with a red demonic hand. A music video for the song was released on September 29, 2016, which continued the theme of allusions to a diabolical nature. The video consists of footage of the band performing in a stylized black and white setting, with the only color visible being a few things in red, including some parts of the background, and frontwoman Taylor Momsen's lips and pendant necklace. In October 2016, the song topped the Billboard Mainstream Rock Songs, making the band the first to ever send their first four songs on the chart to the number one spot. The song also extended the band's record for most number ones on the chart by a female-fronted band.

The band performed the song on Conan O'Brien's late-night talk show Conan on February 28, 2016.

Themes and composition
The song tells the story of a musician who sold her soul to the devil in exchange for success in music, harking back to the old legend of musicians going down to the crossroads in the Mississippi Delta to make deals with the devil for fame and fortune.

Credits and personnel
 Taylor Momsen – lead vocals, rhythm guitar
 Ben Phillips – lead guitar
 Mark Damon – bass
 Jamie Perkins – drums

Charts

Weekly charts

Year-end charts

Release history

References

2016 singles
2016 songs
The Pretty Reckless songs
Razor & Tie singles
Songs written by Taylor Momsen